Coelodasys unicornis, the unicorn caterpillar moth, unicorn prominent or variegated prominent, is a species of moth in the family Notodontidae. It was first described by James Edward Smith in 1797 and is found in North America south of the Arctic.

The wingspan is 24–35 mm. The forewings are dark grey, variably shaded and marked with yellowish, rose and brown. The hindwings are dirty white, shaded with grey in males and dark grey in females. Adults are on wing from February to September in the south and from May to August in the north. There is one generation per year.

The larvae feed on Alnus, Malus, Populus tremuloides, Betula papyrifera, Ulmus, Crataegus, Carya and Salix species. They are brown, although the second and third thoracic segments are bright green. The head is mottled brown. Larvae can be found from May to October in the south and from June to September in the north. The species overwinters in its pupae stage in a cocoon beneath leaf litter.

This species was formerly a member of the genus Schizura, but was transferred to Coelodasys as a result of research published in 2021.

References

Moths described in 1797
Notodontidae
Moths of North America